Rosemary Nicols (born Rosemary Claxton; 28 October 1941, in Bradford, England) is a British actress. She comes from a theatrical family and was the author of the 1967 book The Loving Adventures of Jaby.

Biography

She was educated at Haberdashers' Aske's School for Girls in Acton, west London. She made appearances as a child actress, before studying at the Central School of Speech and Drama and went into rep at Harrogate, Frinton-on-Sea and Wimbledon amongst others. Her first London lead was in Something Nasty in the Woodshed.

In films, she featured in The Blue Lamp (1950), The Pleasure Girls (1965) and The Mini Affair (1967), and on stage in Fiddler on the Roof with Topol. She appeared in numerous television series such as the sci-fi drama Undermind in 1965, and Man in a Suitcase in 1968 but her best-known role was as computer expert Annabelle Hurst in the television series Department S. She played the title role in the 1964 BBC series Ann Veronica based on a novel by H.G. Wells.

Later roles included Anna Sergeyevna in a 1971 adaptation of Ivan Turgenev's Fathers and Sons, and appearances in shows like The Persuaders! and General Hospital. Nicols had her own folk music programme on TV but was soon to give up acting; she married writer Frederic Mullally and moved to Malta to concentrate on writing. Nicols later moved to the US and recently contributed to the documentary Wanna Watch a Television Series?.

Filmography
 The Blue Lamp (1950)
 The Pleasure Girls (1965)
 Undermind (1965 )
 The Mini-Affair (1967)
 Brown Eye, Evil Eye (1967)

References

External links
 

1941 births
Living people
English film actresses
English television actresses
English actresses
English writers
Alumni of the Royal Central School of Speech and Drama